Utebo is a town located in the province of Zaragoza, Aragon, Spain. At the time of the 2011 census (INE), the municipality had a population of 18,602 inhabitants, being the third most populous town of the province, only surpassed by Zaragoza and Calatayud, and one of the most populous in Aragon.

Location

Utebo is distributed in three neighborhoods: the Old Town, El Monte (area developed in the 1940s) and the neighborhood of Malpica (bordering the neighborhood of Casetas, which belongs to Zaragoza).
The town is in the right bank of the River Ebro. Its municipal area is flat and the 67% of the municipal area are farmland, from which the 70% are irrigated supplied by the River Ebro canals, by the River Jalon canals and the Imperial Canal of Aragon.

Utebo belongs to Campo de Zaragoza, being the most populated town behind the capital city. Its municipal area borders Casetas neighborhood on the west, Alfocea on the north, Garrapinillos on the south and Zaragoza on the east.

History
The name Utebo comes from the Latin 'Octavius'. Octavius was founded with Caesar Augusta (Zaragoza) in 24-13 BC.
After the conquest of Zaragoza by Alfonso the Battler in 1118, Utebo belonged to the Christian kingdoms. At that time, Utebo had a population of 115 inhabitants.
The Peninsular War resulted in Utebo being almost abandoned in 1808. However, from 1850 the population began to grow to a population of 585 inhabitants. In 1906 Utebo became an independent municipality.

Demography

In 2012 Utebo had a population of 18,281 inhabitants, this implies that from 1900 -when it had a population of only 1,799 inhabitants- its population has increased tenfold.

Economy

The agriculture and the industry are the main economic activities. The most important crops are vegetables, corn and cereals.
Utebo has an industrial area on the N-232 road, between Zaragoza and Casetas neighborhood. In this area there are five industrial parks: El Águila, La Casaza, La Estación, San Idelfonso y Utebo, the largest. The industry is not excessively specialized, with metallurgy activities, construction, production of chemicals, furniture and food.

Patrimony

Church of Our Lady of the Assumption

The church of Our Lady of the Assumption was built in two phases, the first in the 16th century in Gothic-Mudejar style and the second in the 18th century in Baroque style. It has a beautiful mudejar tower, called Torre de los Espejos (Tower of the Mirrors), for its ceramic ornaments with more of 8000 tiling. Considered one of the most beautiful tower of Aragon, it is represented in the Pueblo Español de Barcelona.
Inside the temple, the altarpiece, made of gilded wood, is dedicated to the Virgin. It is a Baroque-Rococo work of the 18th century. There are two other altarpieces dedicated to the Immaculate and to the Sacred Heart.

Civil architecture

In the Old Town of Utebo there are several brick houses with three floors, with access cover of centered arch, lintelled hollow galleries on the upper floor, and brick, wood or tile eaves.
Also in the Plaza de la Constitución are found the unique buildings of the Town Hall, the Day Centre, and the 'El Molino' Centre. The latter is situated on the remains of the old Utebo Mill, the only old building situated in El Monte. The mill was used for flour production.

Cultural heritage

Utebo has a museum-cultural centre named Centro Cultural Mariano Mesonada (Mariano Mesonada Cultural Centre). It houses the Museo Orús (Orus Museum), which exhibits the paintings of José Orús, an Aragonese artist.

Festivities

 Celebrations of San Lamberto, June 19
 Celebrations of Santa Ana, July 26

Twin towns

Utebo is twinned with:
 Plaisance-du-Touch, France

Notable people
J. J. Arcega-Whiteside (born 1996), American football wide receiver

References

Municipalities in the Province of Zaragoza